The Interstate Highways in Idaho are the segments of the Dwight D. Eisenhower National System of Interstate and Defense Highways owned and maintained by the Idaho Transportation Department (ITD) in the U.S. state of Idaho.



Mainline highways

Business routes

See also

 List of U.S. Highways in Idaho
 List of state highways in Idaho

References

External links

 
Interstate